Brookfield is a town in Carroll County, New Hampshire, United States. The population was 755 at the 2020 census.

History
Settled in 1726 by Scots-Irish immigrants, the town was first named "Coleraine" after the Protestant-majority town of that name in County Londonderry in what has since become Northern Ireland. Fertile ground made it popular with farmers. It was later renamed "Brookfield", after Brookfield, Massachusetts, and made a part of the town of Middleton. But in 1785 Brookfield petitioned, unsuccessfully, to be set off from Middleton. This was due to the division of the original town of Middleton into two parts by the long, high ridge of the Moose Mountains, then a considerable obstacle to travel. Town meetings, traditionally held in the muddy season of March, were particularly difficult to attend for those beyond the ridge. In 1794, however, permission was granted, and Brookfield incorporated. And in 1840, when Carroll County was set off from Strafford County, Brookfield went with Carroll, and Middleton remained with Strafford.

In 1874, the Wolfeborough Branch Railroad passed through this town.

Geography
Brookfield is drained primarily by the Branch River and Pike Brook, within the Piscataqua River (coastal) watershed, though the western edge of the town is in the Merrimack River watershed and the northernmost tip of the town is in the Saco River watershed.

Brookfield is served by New Hampshire Route 109.

Adjacent municipalities
 Wolfeboro (north)
 Wakefield (east)
 Middleton (south)
 New Durham (southwest)

Demographics

As of the census of 2000, there were 604 people, 236 households, and 180 families residing in the town.  The population density was 26.4 people per square mile (10.2/km2).  There were 280 housing units at an average density of 12.2 per square mile (4.7/km2).  The racial makeup of the town was 99.01% White, 0.33% Native American, 0.17% Pacific Islander, and 0.50% from two or more races. Hispanic or Latino of any race were 0.33% of the population.

There were 236 households, out of which 30.5% had children under the age of 18 living with them, 66.5% were married couples living together, 6.8% had a female householder with no husband present, and 23.7% were non-families. 18.2% of all households were made up of individuals, and 7.2% had someone living alone who was 65 years of age or older.  The average household size was 2.56 and the average family size was 2.93.

In the town, the population was spread out, with 23.3% under the age of 18, 5.5% from 18 to 24, 25.3% from 25 to 44, 29.1% from 45 to 64, and 16.7% who were 65 years of age or older.  The median age was 43 years. For every 100 females, there were 94.2 males.  For every 100 females age 18 and over, there were 91.3 males.

The median income for a household in the town was $52,132, and the median income for a family was $54,688. Males had a median income of $36,154 versus $26,719 for females. The per capita income for the town was $25,745.  About 1.1% of families and 1.5% of the population were below the poverty line, including none of those under age 18 and 1.9% of those age 65 or over.

References

External links
 
 New Hampshire Economic and Labor Market Information Bureau Profile

Towns in Carroll County, New Hampshire
Towns in New Hampshire
Populated places established in 1726
1726 establishments in the Thirteen Colonies